Butari is a small settlement close to the source of the Dragonja River in the City Municipality of Koper in the Littoral region of Slovenia.

References

External links
Butari on Geopedia

Populated places in the City Municipality of Koper